Fencing at the 1978 Asian Games was held in Bangkok, Thailand in December, 1978.

Medalists

Men

Women

Medal table

References 

Results
Results
Results

External links
Asian Games medalists

 
1978 Asian Games events
1978
Asian Games
International fencing competitions hosted by Thailand